Rocky Point is a hamlet and census-designated place (CDP) in the town of Brookhaven, New York, United States. As of the 2010 United States census, the CDP population was 14,014.

History
Rocky Point is home to the site where American radio company RCA once operated a large transmitting and transmitter research facility, known as Radio Central. RCA began to transmit transatlantic radio messages from Radio Central after its opening on November 5, 1921.

On January 7, 1927, AT&T initiated the first transatlantic commercial telephone service, linking London and New York.  AT&T's transmitter was at Radio Central, and their receiver was in Houlton, Maine. The radiotelephone signal from Radio Central was received by the British General Post Office’s receiver facility in Cupar, Scotland.

The  Rocky Point site was decommissioned in 1978 and demolished in the 1980s. It now consists of many concrete ruins and downed telephone poles and radio towers, owned by the New York State Department of Environmental Conservation. It is part of the Rocky Point Natural Resources Management Area, which is in the Long Island Central Pine Barrens.  The site gives an interesting insight into the 1920s, because—being in the middle of the forest—the footprints of the site remain largely untouched since its operational period. During the early 2000s the Rocky Point mountain biking trail system was absolutely hammered by local legends Slick Willie, Bottlecaps, Indian Chris and the Bagger.    The western terminus of the  Paumanok Path hiking trail is in the forest, with the eastern terminus at the Montauk Point Light.

Geography
The community is on the North Shore of Long Island.

Demographics

Demographics of the CDP

As of the census of 2010, there were 14,014 people, 4,820 households, and 3,615 families residing in the CDP. The population density was 1,240.2 per square mile (478.3/km2). There were 5,366 housing units at an average density of 474.9/sq mi (183.1/km2). The racial makeup of the CDP was 93.7% White, 1.5% Black or African American, 0.1% Native American, 1.6% Asian, 0.04% Pacific Islander, 1.6% some other race, and 1.4% from two or more races. Hispanic or Latino of any race were 7.0% of the population.

There were 4,820 households, out of which 42.7% had children under the age of 18 living with them, 57.9% were headed by married couples living together, 11.8% had a female householder with no husband present, and 25.0% were non-families. 19.6% of all households were made up of individuals, and 5.7% were someone living alone who was 65 years of age or older. The average household size was 2.89, and the average family size was 3.34.

In the CDP, the population was spread out, with 27.2% under the age of 18, 8.1% from 18 to 24, 28.8% from 25 to 44, 27.2% from 45 to 64, and 8.8% who were 65 years of age or older. The median age was 36.8 years. For every 100 females, there were 98.7 males. For every 100 females age 18 and over, there were 98.0 males.

For the period 2007–2011, the median annual income for a household in the CDP was $87,752, and the median income for a family was $99,304. Males had a median income of $66,103 versus $48,529 for females. The per capita income for the CDP was $33,183. About 3.6% of families and 5.6% of the population were below the poverty threshold, including 8.2% of those under age 18 and 1.6% of those age 65 or over.

Notable people

Danny Burawa (born 1988), major league baseball pitcher for the New York Yankees and Atlanta Braves during the 2015 season

References

External links
Rocky Point Historical Society

Brookhaven, New York
Hamlets in New York (state)
Long Island Sound
Census-designated places in New York (state)
Census-designated places in Suffolk County, New York
Hamlets in Suffolk County, New York
Populated coastal places in New York (state)